The Regional District of North Okanagan (RDNO) is a regional district in the Canadian province of British Columbia, Canada. The Canada 2011 Census population was 81,237. The land area is 7,512.58 km² (2,900.62 sq mi).  The regional district's head office is in the district municipality of Coldstream, although the largest population centre is its immediate neighbour, the city of Vernon.

Demographics 

Subdivisions
Cities
Armstrong - 4,815
Enderby - 2,964
Vernon - 40,116
District municipalities
Coldstream - 10,314
Spallumcheen - 5,055
Village
Lumby - 2,000
Regional district electoral areas
North Okanagan B
North Okanagan C
North Okanagan D
North Okanagan E
North Okanagan F
Indian reserves
NB These are excluded from governance by the regional district and have their own governments (the Spallumcheen Indian Band and the Okanagan Indian Band).
Enderby Indian Reserve No. 2
Harris Indian Reserve No. 3
Okanagan Indian Reserve No. 1 (only partly within the RD)
Priest's Valley Indian Reserve No. 6

Notes

References

External links

 
North Okanagan